This is a list of butterflies of Turkey. At least 400 true species are known from Turkey but there are certainly more. The names in italics following the dash are the common names in Turkish.

Papilionidae
Allancastria cerisyi (Godart, 1824) – ormanfistosu
Allancastria caucasica (Lederer, 1864) – Kafkas fistosu
Allancastria deyrollei (Oberthür, 1869) – stepfistosu
Archon apollinaris (Staudinger, [1892]) – küçük yalancıapollo
Archon apollinus (Herbst, 1789) – yalancı Apollo
Iphiclides podalirius (Linnaeus, 1758) – erik kırlangıçkuyruk
Papilio alexanor (Esper, 1800) – kaplan kırlangıçkuyruk
Papilio demoleus (Linnaeus, 1758) – Nusaybin güzeli
Papilio machaon (Linnaeus, 1758) – kırlangıçkuyruk
Parnassius apollo (Linnaeus, 1758) – Apollo
Parnassius mnemosyne (Linnaeus, 1758) – dumanlı Apollo
Parnassius nordmanni (Ménétriés, [1850]) – Kafkas Apollosu
Zerynthia polyxena (Denis & Schiffermüller, 1775) – Güneyfistosu

Pieridae
Anthocharis cardamines (Linnaeus, 1758) – turuncusüslü
Anthocharis damone (Boisduval, 1836) – süslüdamone
Anthocharis gruneri (Herrich-Schäffer, [1851]) – stepsüslüsü
Aporia crataegi (Linnaeus, 1758) – alıçbeyazı
Belenois aurota (Fabricius, 1793) – beyazöncü
Catopsilia florella (Fabricius, 1775) – Afrikagöçmeni
Colias aurorina (Herrich-Schäffer, 1850) – Anadolu azameti
Colias caucasica (Staudinger, 1871) – Kafkas azameti
Colias chlorocoma (Christoph, 1888) – Azeri azameti
Colias croceus (Geoffroy, 1785) – sarı azamet
Colias erate (Esper, 1805) – doğu azameti
Colias hyale (Linnaeus, 1758) – orman azameti
Colias alfacariensis Ribbe, 1905 – güzel azamet
Colias thisoa (Ménétriés, 1832) – Turan azameti
Colotis fausta (Olivier, 1804) – Mezopotamya kolotisi
Euchloe ausonia (Hübner, 1805) – dağ öyklosu
Euchloe belemia (Esper, 1800) – Akdeniz öyklosu
Euchloe penia (Freyer, 1852) – doğu elfinstonyası
Gonepteryx cleopatra (Linnaeus, 1767) – Kleopatra
Gonepteryx farinosa (Zeller, 1847) – Anadolu orakkanadı
Gonepteryx rhamni (Linnaeus, 1758) – orakkanat
Leptidea duponcheli (Staudinger, 1871) – doğulu narinormanbeyazı
Leptidea morsei (Fenton, [1882]) – Fenton'un narinormanbeyazı
Leptidea sinapis (Linnaeus, 1758) – narin ormanbeyazı
Pieris bowdeni (Eitschberger, 1983) – Bowden'in beyazmeleği
Pieris brassicae (Linnaeus, 1758) – büyük beyazmelek or lahanakelebeği
Pieris bryoniae (Hübner, 1806) – çizgili dağbeyazmeleği
Pieris ergane (Geyer, [1828]) – dağ küçük beyazmeleği or dağ beyazmeleği
Pieris krueperi (Staudinger, 1860) – krüper'in beyazmeleği
Pieris mannii (Mayer, 1851) – mann'ın beyazmeleği
Pieris napi (Linnaeus, 1758) – yeşildamarlı beyaz
Pieris persis (Verity, 1922) – İran beyazmeleği
Pieris pseudorapae (Verity, [1908]) – yalancı beyazmelek
Pieris rapae (Linnaeus, 1758) – küçük beyazmelek
Pontia callidice (Hübner, [1799–1800]) – dorukların beneklimeleği
Pontia chloridice (Hübner, [1808–1813]) – küçük beneklimelek
Pontia daplidice (Linnaeus, 1758) – beneklimelek
Pontia edusa (Fabricius, 1777) – yeni benekli melek
Zegris eupheme (Esper, 1804) – zegris

Riodinidae
Hamearis lucina (Linnaeus, 1758) – incilikelebek

Nymphalidae
Aglais io (Linnaeus, 1758) – tavuskelebeği
Aglais urticae (Linnaeus, 1758) – aglais
Apatura ilia ([Schiffermüller], 1775) – küçük morimparator
Apatura metis (Freyer, 1829) – Trakya imparatoru
Aphantopus hyperantus (Linnaeus, 1758) – halkacık
Araschnia levana (Linnaeus, 1758) – ısırgan kelebeği
Arethusana arethusa ([Denis & Schiffermüller, 1775]) – seyit
Argynnis pandora ([Schiffermüller], 1775) – bahadır
Argynnis paphia (Linnaeus, 1758) – cengaver
Boloria caucasica (Lederer, 1852) – Kafkas menekşekelebeği
Boloria graeca (Staudinger, 1870) – Balkan menekşekelebeği
Brenthis daphne (Bergsträsser, 1780) – böğürtlen brentisi
Brenthis hecate ([Denis & Schiffermüller], 1775) – çift noktalı brentis
Brenthis ino (Rottemburg, 1775) – küçük brentis
Brenthis mofidii (Wyatt, 1968) – İran brentisi
Brintesia circe (Fabricius, 1775) – karamurat
Charaxes jasius (Linnaeus, 1767) – çift kuyruklu paşa
Chazara bischoffii (Herrich-Schäffer, [1846]) – kızıl cadı
Chazara briseis (Linnaeus, 1764) – cadı
Chazara egina (Staudinger, [1892]) – Anadolu cadısı
Chazara persephone (Hübner, [1805]) – stepcadısı
Clossiana dia (Linnaeus, 1767) – morinci
Clossiana euphrosyne (Linnaeus, 1758) – beyazinci
Coenonympha arcania (Linnaeus, 1761) – funda zıpzıp perisi
Coenonympha glycerion (Borkhausen, 1788) – orman zıpzıp perisi
Coenonympha leander (Esper, 1784) – Rus zıpzıp perisi
Coenonympha pamphilus (Linnaeus, 1758) – küçük zıpzıp perisi
Coenonympha saadi (Kollar, [1849]) – İran zıpzıp perisi
Coenonympha symphita (Lederer, 1870) – Kafkasya zıpzıp perisi
Danaus chrysippus (Linnaeus, 1758) – sultan
Erebia aethiops (Esper, 1777) – İskoç güzelesmeri
Erebia graucasica (Jachontov, 1909) – Kafkas güzelesmeri
Erebia hewitsonii (Lederer, 1864) – Laz güzelesmeri
Erebia iranica (Grum-Grshimailo, 1895) – acem güzelesmeri
Erebia ligea (Linnaeus, 1758) – güzelesmer
Erebia medusa (Fabricius, 1787) – orman güzelesmeri
Erebia melancholica (Herrich-Schäffer, [1846]) – mecnun güzelesmeri
Erebia ottomana (Herrich-Schäffer, [1847]) – Osmanlı güzelesmeri or harem güzelesmeri
Euapatura mirza (Ebert, 1971) – şehzade
Euphydryas aurinia (Rottemburg, 1775) – nazuğum
Euphydryas orientalis (Herrich-Schäffer, [1851]) – güzel nazuğum
Fabriciana adippe (Schiffermüller, 1775) – büyük inci
Fabriciana niobe (Linnaeus, 1758) – niyobe
Hipparchia aristaeus (Bonelli, 1826) – Güney kızılmeleği
Hipparchia fagi (Scopoli, 1763) – orman karameleği
Hipparchia fatua (Freyer, 1845) – Anadolu karameleği
Hipparchia mersina (Staudinger, 1871) – Mersin kızılmeleği
Hipparchia parisatis (Kollar, [1849]) – beyaz bandlı karamelek
Hipparchia pellucida (Stauder, 1924) – Anadolu kızılmeleği
Hipparchia pisidice (Klug, 1832) – Arap karameleği
Hipparchia statilinus (Hufnagel, 1766) – ağaç karameleği
Hipparchia syriaca (Staudinger, 1871) – büyük karamelek
Hipparchia volgensis (Mazochin-Porshnyakov, 1952) – Rus kızılmeleği
Hypolimnas misippus (Linnaeus, 1764) – hipolimnas
Hyponephele cadusia (Lederer, [1869]) – İran esmerperisi
Hyponephele hasantahsin (Kocjak & Kemal, 2002) – hasan tahsin esmerperisi
Hyponephele kocaki (Eckweiler, 1978) – Koçak'ın esmerperisi
Hyponephele lupina (Costa, 1836) – esmerperi
Hyponephele lycaon (Kühn, 1774) – küçük esmerperi
Hyponephele lycaonoides (Weiss, 1978) – yalancı esmerperi
Hyponephele naricoides (Gross, 1977) – Gross'un esmerperisi
Hyponephele urartua (de Freina & Aussem, 1986) – Urartu esmerperisi
Hyponephele wagneri (Herrich-Schäffer, [1846]) – Ağrı esmerperisi
Hyponephele zuvandica (Samodurow, Korolew & Tschikolowez, 1996) – Azeri esmerperi
Issoria lathonia (Linnaeus, 1758) – İspanyol kraliçesi
Junonia orithya (Linnaeus, 1758) – Dicle güzeli
Kirinia clymene (Esper, 1783) – kaya esmeri
Kirinia roxelana (Cramer, 1777) – ağaç esmeri
Lasiommata maera (Linnaeus, 1758) – esmerboncuk
Lasiommata megera (Linnaeus, 1767) – küçük esmerboncuk
Lasiommata petropolitana (Fabricius, 1787) – orman esmerboncuk
Libythea celtis (Laicharting, 1782) – çitlembikkelebeği
Limenitis camilla (Linnaeus, 1764) – hanımelikelebeği
Limenitis reducta (Staudinger, 1901) – Akdeniz hanımelikelebeği
Maniola halicarnassus (Thomson, 1990) – Halikarnas esmeri
Maniola jurtina (Linnaeus, 1758) – çayıresmeri
Maniola megala (Oberthür, 1909) – büyük esmer
Maniola telmessia (Zeller, 1847) – doğu çayıresmeri
Melanargia galathea (Linnaeus, 1758) – orman melikesi
Melanargia grumi (Standfuss, 1892) – çölmelikesi
Melanargia hylata (Ménétriés, 1832) – Azeri melikesi
Melanargia larissa (Geyer, [1828]) – Anadolu melikesi
Melanargia russiae (Esper, 1783) – Uygur melikesi
Melanargia syriaca (Oberthür, 1894) – kara melike
Melanargia titea (Klug, 1982) – Levantin melikesi
Melanargia wiskotti (Röber, 1896) – Akdeniz melikesi
Melitaea arduinna (Esper, 1783) – Türkistan İparhanı
Melitaea athalia (Rottemburg, 1775) – Amannisa
Melitaea aurelia Nickerl, 1850 – güzel Amannisa
Melitaea britomartis Assmann, 1847 – melike Amannisa
Melitaea caucasogenita Verity, 1930 – Kafkasyalı Amannisa
Melitaea cinxia (Linnaeus, 1758) – İparhan
Melitaea collina (Lederer, 1861) – Hataylı İparhan
Melitaea diamina (Lang, 1789) – funda İparhanı
Melitaea didyma (Esper, 1778) – benekli İparhan
Melitaea interrupta (Kolenati, 1846) – Kafkasyalı İparhan
Melitaea irka (Coutsis & van Oorschot, 2014) – Artvin İparhan
Melitaea mesopotamica (Coutsis & van Oorschot, 2014) – Mezopotamya İparhan
Melitaea ornata (Christoph, 1893) – Rusya İparhan
Melitaea persea (Kollar, [1850]) – İran İparhan
Melitaea phoebe (Goeze, 1779) – benekli büyük İparhan
Melitaea syriaca (Rebel, 1905) – Suriye İparhan
Minois dryas (Scopoli, 1763) – karahayalet
Neptis rivularis (Scopoli, 1763) – süzülen karakız
Nymphalis antiopa (Linnaeus, 1758) – sarı bandlı kadife
Nymphalis l-album (Esper, 1781) – yalancı virgül
Nymphalis polychloros (Linnaeus, 1758) – karaağaç nimfalisi
Nymphalis xanthomelas (Esper, 1781) – sarı ayaklı nimfalis
Polygonia c-album (Linnaeus, 1758) – yırtıkpırtık
Polygonia egea (Cramer, [1775]) – Anadolu yırtıkpırtığı
Pararge aegeria (Linnaeus, 1758) – karanlık ormanesmeri
Proclossiana eunomia (Esper, 1800) – bataklık noktalıkelebeği
Proterebia afra (Fabricius, 1787) – Uygur guzelesmeri
Pseudochazara anthelea (Hübner, [1823–1824]) – Anadolu yalancıcadısı
Pseudochazara aurantiaca (Staudinger, 1871) – doruk yalancıcadısı
Pseudochazara beroe (Herrich-Schäffer, [1844]) – dağ yalancıcadısı
Pseudochazara geyeri (Herrich-Schäffer, [1846]) – Geyer'in yalancı cadısı
Pseudochazara guriensis (Staudinger, 1878) – Gürcistan yalancıcadısı
Pseudochazara lydia (Staudinger, 1878) – Lidya yalancı cadısı
Pseudochazara mamurra (Herrich-Schäffer, [1846]) – Osmanlı yalancıcadısı
Pseudochazara mniszechii (Herrich-Schäffer, [1851]) – step yalancıcadısı
Pseudochazara pelopea (Klug, 1832) – Levantin yalancıcadısı
Pseudochazara schakuhensis (Staudinger, 1881) – İran yalancıcadısı
Pseudochazara telephassa (Geyer, [1827]) – Turan yalancıcadısı
Pyronia cecilia (Vallantin, 1894) – Sesilya
Pyronia tithonus (Linnaeus, 1771) – pironiya
Satyrus amasinus (Staudinger, 1861) – beyaz damarlı Pirireis
Satyrus favonius (Staudinger, [1892]) – Anadolu Pirireisi
Satyrus ferulus (Fabricius, 1793) – haşmetli Pirireis
Satyrus iranicus (Schwingenschuss, 1939) – İran Pirireisi
Satyrus parthicus (Lederer, 1869) – Kaspi Pirireisi
Speyeria aglaja (Linnaeus, 1758) – güzel inci
Thaleropis ionia (Fischer de Waldheim & Eversmann, 1851) – Anadolu şehzadesi
Triphysa phryne (Pallas, 1771) – Sibirya perisi
Vanessa atalanta (Linnaeus, 1758) – atalanta
Vanessa cardui (Linnaeus, 1758) – dikenkelebeği
Ypthima asterope (Klug, 1832) – Karagöz

Lycaenidae
Afarsia morgiana (Kirby, 1871) – İran çokgözlüsü
Agriades pyrenaica (Boisduval, 1840) – Pirene çokgözlüsü
Aricia agestis (Denis & Schiffermüller, 1775) – çokgözlü esmer
Aricia anteros (Freyer, 1839) – çokgözlü Balkanmavisi
Aricia artaxerxes (Fabricius, 1793) – çokgözlü ormanesmeri
Aricia bassoni (Larsen, 1974) – çokgözlü Lübnanmavisi
Aricia crassipuncta (Christoph, 1893) – çokgözlü Anadolumavisi
Aricia hyacinthus (Herrich-Schäffer, [1847]) – Anadolu çokgözlüsü
Aricia isaurica (Staudinger, 1870) – çokgözlü Torosmavisi
Aricia teberdina (Sheljuzhko, 1934) – çokgözlü Teberdamavisi
Aricia torulensis (Hesselbarth & Siepe, 1993) – çokgözlü Torulmavisi
Athamanthia phoenicura (Lederer, [1870]) – İran bakırgüzeli
Azanus jesous (Guérin-Méneville, 1849) – Afrika mücevher kelebeği
Cacyreus marshalli (Butler, 1897) – geranyumbronzu
Callophrys danchenkoi (Zhdanko, 1998) – Nahçıvan zümrütü
Callophrys herculeana (Pfeiffer, 1927) – büyük zümrüt
Callophrys mystaphia (Miller, 1913) – ışgınzümrütü or minikzümrüt
Callophrys paulae (Pfeiffer, 1932) – Anadolu zümrütü
Callophrys rubi (Linnaeus, 1758) – zümrüt
Celastrina argiolus (Linnaeus, 1758) – kutsalmavi
Cigaritis acamas (Klug, 1834) – Seytancık
Cigaritis cilissa (Lederer, 1861) – Akdeniz Seytancığı
Cigaritis uighurica (Kemal & Koçak, 2005) – Uygur Seytancığı
Cupido alcetas (Hoffmannsegg, 1804) – Fransız everesi
Cupido argiades (Pallas, 1771) – everes
Cupido decoloratus (Staudinger, 1886) – Balkan everesi
Cupido minimus (Fuessly, 1775) – minik Kupid
Cupido osiris (Meigen, 1829) – mavi Osiris
Cupido staudingeri (Christoph, 1873) – Staudinger'in minikmavisi
Cyaniris bellis (Freyer, [1842]) – çokgözlü güzelmavi
Cyaniris semiargus (Rottemburg, 1775) – Mazarinmavisi
Eumedonia eumedon (Esper, 1780) – çokgözlü geraniummavisi
Favonius quercus (Linnaeus, 1758) – mormeşe
Freyeria trochylus (Freyer, 1845) – mücevher kelebeği
Glaucopsyche alexis (Poda, 1761) – Karagözmavisi
Glaucopsyche astraea (Freyer, [1851]) – Anadolu Karagözmavisi
Iolana lessei (Bernardi, 1964) – dev mavi
Kretania alcedo (Christoph, 1877) – acem çokgözlüsü
Kretania eurypilus (Freyer, 1852) – doğulu esmergöz
Kretania modica (Verity, 1935) – Anadolu esmergözü
Kretania nicholli (Elwes, 1901) – Lübnan esmergözü
Kretania sephirus (Frivaldszky, 1835) – Balkan esmergözü
Kretania zephyrinus (Christoph, 1884) – Türkmenistan esmergözü
Lampides boeticus (Linnaeus, 1767) – lampides
Leptotes pirithous (Linnaeus, 1767) – mavi zebra
Luthrodes galba (Lederer, 1855) – Akdeniz mücevherkelebeği
Lycaena alciphron (Rottemburg, 1775) – büyük morbakırgüzeli
Lycaena asabinus (Herrich-Schäffer, [1851]) – Anadolu ateşgüzeli
Lycaena candens (Herrich-Schäffer, [1844]) – ateşbakırgüzeli
Lycaena dispar (Haworth, 1802) – büyük bakırgüzeli
Lycaena lampon (Lederer, [1870]) – İranateşgüzeli
Lycaena ochimus (Herrich-Schäffer, [1851]) – alevli ateşgüzeli
Lycaena ottomanus (Lefèbvre, 1830) – Osmanlıateşi
Lycaena phlaeas (Linnaeus, 1761) – beneklibakırgüzeli
Lycaena thersamon (Esper, 1784) – küçük ateşgüzeli
Lycaena thetis (Klug, 1834) – dağateşi
Lycaena tityrus (Poda, 1761) – islibakırgüzeli
Lycaena virgaureae (Linnaeus, 1758) – ormanbakırgüzeli
Lysandra bellargus (Rottemburg, 1775) – çokgözlü gökmavisi
Lysandra coridon (Poda, 1761) – çokgözlü çillimavi
Lysandra corydonius (Herrich-Schäffer, [1852]) – çokgözlü yalancıçillimavi
Lysandra dezina de Freina & Witt, 1983 – çokgözlü Hakkariçillisi
Lysandra ossmar (Gerhard, 1851) – çokgözlü Anadoluçillimavisi
Lysandra syriaca (Tutt, 1914) – çokgözlü Levantinçillimavisi
Margelycaena euphratica (Eckweiler, 1989) – Fıratbakırgüzeli
Neolycaena soezen (Seven, 2014) – Sözen'in çokgözlüsü
Neolysandra coelestina (Eversmann, 1843) – çokgözlü Rusmavisi
Neolysandra diana (Miller, [1913]) – çokgözlü Dianamavisi
Neolysandra fatima Eckweiler & Schurian, 1980 – çokgözlü Fatmamavisi
Phengaris alcon (Denis & Schiffermüller, 1775) – küçük korubeni
Phengaris arion (Linnaeus, 1758) – büyük korubeni
Phengaris nausithous (Bergsträsser, [1779]) – esmer korubeni
Phengaris rebeli (Hirschke, 1904) – Rebel'in korubenisi
Plebejidea loewii (Zeller, 1847) – çokgözlü gümüşmavi
Plebejus argus (Linnaeus, 1758) – gümüşlekeli esmergöz
Plebejus argyrognomon (Bergstrasser, [1779]) – Avrupalı esmergöz
Plebejus christophi (Staudinger, 1874) – Christoph'un esmergözü
Plebejus idas (Linnaeus, 1761) – İdasmavisi or esmergöz
Plebejus maracandica (Erschoff, 1874) – Kızılkum esmergözü
Polyommatus actis actis (Herrich-Schäffer, [1851]) – lacivert Anadolu çokgözlüsü
Polyommatus actis bilgini (Dantchenko & Lukhtanov, 2002) – çokgözlü Bilginmavisi or Bilgin'in çokgözlüsü
Polyommatus actis haigi (Dantchenko & Lukhtanov, 2002) – çokgözlü Karabetmavisi
Polyommatus admetus (Esper, 1783) – anormal çokgözlü
Polyommatus aedon (Christoph, 1887) – çokgözlü Edonmavisi
Polyommatus alcestis (Zerny, 1932) – çokgözlü Lübnanesmeri
Polyommatus alibalii (Carbonell, 2015) – Bali'in çokgözlüsü
Polyommatus altivagans (Forster, 1956) – lacivert Azeri çokgözlüsü
Polyommatus amandus (Schneider, 1792) – çokgözlü Amanda
Polyommatus anticarmon (Koçak, 1983) – çokgözlü antikarmon
Polyommatus antidolus (Rebel, 1901) – çokgözlü Anadolutüylüsü
Polyommatus antiochenus (Lederer, 1861) – Hatay'ın çokgözlü güzelmavisi
Polyommatus aroaniensis (Brown, 1976) – Yunan anormal çokgözlüsü
Polyommatus artvinensis (Carbonell, 1997) – çokgözlü Artvinmavisi
Polyommatus athis athis ((Freyer, 1851) – Freyer'in çokgözlüsü
Polyommatus athis sigberti ((Olivier & van der Poorten & De Prins & De Prins, 2000) – Sigbert Wagener'in çokgözlüsü
Polyommatus baytopi (de Lesse, 1959) – Baytop'un çokgözlüsü
Polyommatus bollandi (Dumont, 1998) – çokgözlü Hataymavisi
Polyommatus buzulmavi (Carbonell, 1991) – çokgözlü buzulmavi
Polyommatus caeruleus (Staudinger, 1871) – çokgözlü masmavi
Polyommatus cilicius (Carbonell, 1998) – Gülek çokgözlüsü
Polyommatus ciloicus (de Freina & Witt, 1983) – çokgözlü Cilomavisi
Polyommatus cornelius (Gerhard, 1851) – çokgözlü küçük Turanmavisi
Polyommatus cyaneus (Staudinger, 1899) – çokgözlü Siyanmavisi
Polyommatus dama (Staudinger, 1891) – çokgözlü Mezopotamyamavisi
Polyommatus damon ([Schiffermüller], 1775) – çokgözlü Damonmavisi
Polyommatus dantchenkoi (Lukhtanov & Wiemers, 2003) – Dançenko çokgözlüsü
Polyommatus daphnis (Schiffermüller, 1775) – çokgözlü Dafnis
Polyommatus demavendi (Pfeiffer, 1938) – çokgözlü demavendesmeri
Polyommatus dorylas (Denis & Schiffermüller, 1775) – çokgözlü turkuvazmavisi
Polyommatus eriwanensis (Forster, 1960) – Erivan anormal çokgözlüsü
Polyommatus eroides (Frivaldszky, 1835) – çokgözlü yalancıeros
Polyommatus eros molleti (Carbonell, [1994]) – çokgözlü Bolkarmavisi
Polyommatus erzindjanensis (Carbonell, 2002) – çokgözlü Erzincanmavisi
Polyommatus escheri (Hübner, [1823]) – çokgözlü Eşermavisi
Polyommatus eurypilos (Gerhard, [1851]) – çokgözlü Gerhardmavisi or Gerhard'ın çokgözlüsü
Polyommatus forsteri (Pfeiffer, 1938) – çokgözlü elburserosu
Polyommatus guezelmavi (Olivier et al., 1999) – çokgözlü Anadolu güzelmavisi
Polyommatus hopfferi (Herrich-Schäffer, [1851]) – Hopfer'in çokgözlüsü
Polyommatus huberti (Carbonell, 1993) – De Lesse'in çokgözlüsü
Polyommatus icarus (Rottemburg, 1775) – çokgözlü mavi
Polyommatus igisizilim (Koçak & Kemal, 2001) – vatanmavisi
Polyommatus iphicarmon (Eckweiler & Rose, 1993) – çokgözlü ifikarmon
Polyommatus iphigenia (Herrich-Schäffer, [1847]) – çokgözlü ifigenya
Polyommatus kanduli kanduli (Dantchenko & Lukhtanov, 2002) – Kandul'in çokgözlüsü
Polyommatus kanduli tortumensis (Carbonell, 2003) – Tortum çokgözlüsü
Polyommatus kanduli urartua (Carbonell, 2003) – Urartumavisi
Polyommatus lycius (Carbonell, 1996) – Carbonellmavisi
Polyommatus maraschi (Forster, 1956) – çokgözlü Maraşmavisi or Maraş çokgözlüsü
Polyommatus menalcas (Freyer, [1837]) – çokgözlü Anadolu beyazı
Polyommatus merhaba (de Prins et al., 1991) – çokgözlü selammavisi
Polyommatus mithridates (Toso & Balletto, 1976) – çokgözlü Amasyaesmeri
Polyommatus myrrhinus (Herrich-Schäffer, [1852]) – çokgözlü büyük Turanmavisi
Polyommatus ninae (Forster, 1956) – Nina'nın çokgözlüsü
Polyommatus persicus (Bienert, 1870) – çokgözlü acemmavisi
Polyommatus phyllis (Christoph, 1877) – çokgözlü İranmavisi
Polyommatus pierceae (Lukhtanov & Dantchenko, 2002) – Pierce'nin çokgözlüsü
Polyommatus poseidon (Herrich-Schäffer, 1851) – çokgözlü Poseydonmavisi
Polyommatus pseudactis (Forster, 1960) – yalancı lacivert Anadolu çokgözlüsü
Polyommatus putnami (Dantchenko & Lukhtanov, 2002) – Putnam'ın çokgözlüsü
Polyommatus ripartii (Freyer, 1830) – Rippert De Beaugency'ın anormal çokgözlüsü
Polyommatus schuriani (Rose, 1978) – çokgözlü Kunchuymavisi
Polyommatus schuriani attalaensis (Carbonell, Borie & J. de Prins, 2004) – attalos mavisi
Polyommatus sertavulensis (Koçak, 1979) – Sertavul çokgözlüsü
Polyommatus surakovi (Dantchenko & Lukhtanov, 1994) – çokgözlü surakomavisi
Polyommatus tankeri (de Lesse, 1960) – Tanker'in çokgözlüsü
Polyommatus theresiae (Schurian, van Oorschot & van den Brink, 1992) – çokgözlü Teresya
Polyommatus thersites (Cantener, 1834) – çokgözlü menekşemavisi
Polyommatus turcicolus (Koçak, 1977) – çokgözlü Vanmavisi
Polyommatus turcicus (Koçak, 1977) – çokgözlü Türkmavisi
Polyommatus vanensis (de Lesse, 1957) – çokgözlü Ağrımavisi
Polyommatus wagneri (Forster, 1956) – Wagner'in çokgözlüsü
Polyommatus zapvadi (Carbonell, 1993) – çokgözlü Zapmavisi
Pseudophilotes bavius (Eversmann, 1832) – Bavius mavisi
Pseudophilotes vicrama (Moore, 1865) – Himalaya mavi kelebeği
Rueckbeilia rosei (Eckweiler, 1989) – Rose'nin çokgözlüsü
Satyrium abdominalis (Gerhard, 1850) – sevbeni
Satyrium acaciae (Fabricius, 1787) – minik sevbeni
Satyrium armenum (Rebel, 1901) – mavi sevbeni
Satyrium hyrcanicum (Riley, 1939) – büyük benekli sevbeni
Satyrium ilicis (Esper, 1779) – büyük sevbeni
Satyrium ledereri (Boisduval, 1848) – küçük benekli sevbeni
Satyrium marcidum (Riley, 1921) – İranlı sevbeni
Satyrium spini (Fabricius, 1787) – güzel sevbeni
Satyrium w-album (Knoch, 1782) – karaağaç sevbenisi
Satyrium zabni (van Oorschot & van den Brink, 1991) – mavibenekli sevbeni
Scolitantides orion (Pallas, 1771) – karamavi
Tarucus balkanicus (Freyer, 1844) – Balkankaplanı
Thecla betulae (Linnaeus, 1758) – huşgüzeli
Tomares callimachus (Eversmann, 1848) – Kafkasya gelinciği
Tomares desinens (Nekrutenko & Effendi, 1980) – Azeri gelinciği
Tomares nesimachus (Oberthür, 1893) – Akdeniz gelinciği or akbes
Tomares nogelii dobrogensis (Caradja, 1895) – Romen gelinciği
Tomares nogelii nogelii (Herrich-Schäffer, [1851]) – Anadolu gelinciği
Tomares romanovi (Christoph, 1882) – Romanov gelinciği
Turanana cytis (Christoph, 1877) – İran Turanmavisi
Turanana panagaea (Herrich-Schäffer, [1851]) – Anadolu Turanmavisi
Turanana taygetica (Rebel, 1902) – Yunan Turanmavisi
Zizeeria karsandra (Moore, 1865) – karsandra

Hesperiidae
Carcharodus alceae (Esper, 1780) – hatmi zıpzıpı
Carcharodus flocciferus (Zeller, 1847) – tüylü zıpzıp
Carcharodus lavatherae (Esper, 1783) – mermer zıpzıpı
Carcharodus orientalis (Reverdin, 1913) – şark zıpzıpı
Carcharodus stauderi (Reverdin, 1913) – Cezayir zıpzıpı
Carterocephalus palaemon (Pallas, 1771) – sarıbenekli zıpzıp
Eogenes alcides (Herrich-Schäffer, [1852]) – alsides zıpzıpı
Eogenes lesliei (Evans, 1910) – Pakistan zıpzıpı
Erynnis marloyi (Boisduval, [1834]) – kara zıpzıp
Erynnis tages (Linnaeus, 1758) – paslı zıpzıp
Gegenes nostrodamus (Fabricius, 1793) – Nostrodamus
Gegenes pumilio (Hoffmannsegg, 1804) – cüce zıpzıp
Hesperia comma (Linnaeus, 1758) – gümüş benekli zıpzıp
Heteropterus morpheus (Pallas, 1771) – beyaz benekli zıpzıp
Muschampia nomas (Lederer, 1855) – Suriye zıpzıpı
Muschampia plurimacula (Christoph, 1893) – benekli zıpzıp
Muschampia poggei (Lederer, 1858) – Pogge zıpzıpı
Muschampia proteides (Wagner, 1929) – Anadolu zıpzıpı
Muschampia proto (Ochsenheimer, 1808) – Akdeniz zıpzıpı
Muschampia tessellum (Hübner, [1800–1803])) – mozaik zıpzıpı
Ochlodes sylvanus (Esper, 1777) – orman zıpzıpı
Pelopidas thrax (Hübner, [1821]) – beyaz çilli kara zıpzıp
Pyrgus aladaghensis (de Prins & Poorten, 1995) – Aladağ zıpzıpı
Pyrgus alveus (Hübner, [1800–1803]) – büyük boz zıpzıp
Pyrgus armoricanus (Oberthür, 1910) – İspanyol zıpzıpı
Pyrgus bolkariensis (de Prins & Poorten, 1995) – Bolkar zıpzıpı
Pyrgus carthami (Hübner, [1813]) – nadir zıpzıp
Pyrgus cinarae (Rambur, 1839) – güzel zıpzıp
Pyrgus cirsii (Rambur, 1839) – beşparmakotu zıpzıpı
Pyrgus jupei (Alberti, 1967) – Kafkasya zıpzıpı
Pyrgus malvae (Linnaeus, 1758) – ebegümeci zıpzıpı
Pyrgus melotis (Duponchel, [1834]) – Ege zıpzıpı
Pyrgus serratulae (Rambur, 1839) – zeytuni zıpzıp
Pyrgus sidae (Esper, 1784) – sarıbandlı zıpzıp
Spialia orbifer (Hübner, [1823]) – kızıl zıpzıp
Spialia osthelderi (Pfeiffer, 1932) – Maraş zıpzıpı
Spialia phlomidis (Herrich-Schäffer, [1845]) – acem zıpzıpı
Thymelicus acteon (Rottemburg, 1775) – sarılekeli zıpzıp
Thymelicus hyrax (Lederer, 1861) – Levantin zıpzıpı
Thymelicus lineolus (Ochsenheimer, 1808) – siyah antenli zıpzıp
Thymelicus novus (Reverdin, 1916) – yeni zıpzıp
Thymelicus sylvestris (Poda, 1761) – sarı-antenli zıpzıp

References

 http://www.kelebek-turk.com/ 
 http://www.butterfliesofturkey.com/
 http://www.turkiyeninkelebekleri.com/

External links

Species List for Asiatic Turkey
Species List for European Turkey
AdaMerOs - Butterflies of Turkey
Kelebek-Turk - Photographs and List of Species of Turkish Butterflies
Butterflies of Turkey
Photographs and List of Species of Turkish Butterflies

Butterflies
Butterflies
Turkey
Turkey
Turkey
Turkey